Khin Khin Win is a former First Lady of Myanmar, and the wife of former President of Myanmar Thein Sein. She was Myanmar's First Lady from 30 March 2011 to 30 March 2016.

In December 2011, Khin Khin Win met U.S. Secretary of State Hillary Clinton during her official visit in Myanmar. On 30 January 2012, the Singapore Botanic Gardens named a new orchid hybrid, the Dendrobium Daw Khin Khin Win, in her honor.

On 2 March 2023, the military government awarded her the title of Agga Maha Thiri Thudhamma Theingi, one of the country’s highest religious honors, for significantly contributing to the flowering and propagation of Buddhism.

Personal life
Khin Khin Win and Thein Sein have three children. One of her daughters, Yin Thuza Thein, married Han Win Aung, a captain in the Burmese military, in 2009.

References

Living people
Year of birth missing (living people)
First ladies of Myanmar
Spouses of prime ministers of Myanmar